The 2019 Gibraltar Open (officially the 2019 Betway Gibraltar Open) was a professional ranking snooker tournament that took place from 15 to 17 March 2019 at the Tercentenary Sports Hall in Gibraltar with qualifying rounds taking place 13–14 March 2019. It was the seventeenth ranking event of the 2018/2019 season.

Stuart Bingham won his 6th career ranking title by defeating defending champion Ryan Day 4–1 in the final.

Prize fund
The breakdown of prize money for this year is shown below:

 Winner: £25,000
 Runner-up: £12,000
 Semi-final: £6,000
 Quarter-final: £4,000
 Last 16: £3,000
 Last 32: £2,500
 Last 64: £1,500

 Total: £177,000

The "rolling 147 prize" for a maximum break: £10,000

Main draw

Top half

Section 1

Section 2

Section 3

Section 4

Bottom half

Section 5

Section 6

Section 7

Section 8

Finals

Final

Amateur pre-qualifying
Qualifying rounds were played in Gibraltar on 13–14 March 2019. All matches were played best of 7 frames.

Round 1

Round 2

Century breaks

Main stage centuries
Total: 46

 142, 134, 112, 103, 103, 102, 102, 100, 100  Stuart Bingham
 142  Chen Feilong
 139, 112   Thepchaiya Un-Nooh
 139, 109  Kyren Wilson
 139  Paul Davison
 139  Chris Wakelin
 136, 111  Kurt Maflin
 135, 105  Peter Ebdon
 129  Ashley Carty
 129  Sean O'Sullivan
 127  Jamie Clarke
 126  Zhao Xintong
 123  David Lilley
 122, 107  David Gilbert
 120, 103, 103, 101  Yuan Sijun
 120  Hammad Miah
 120  Jimmy White
 117  Jack Lisowski
 115  Barry Pinches
 112  Yan Bingtao
 109  James Cahill
 108  Joe Swail
 106  Daniel Wells
 105  Hamza Akbar
 104  Zhou Yuelong
 103  Ross Muir
 102  Martin O'Donnell
 101, 100  Gary Wilson
 100  Ryan Day

Qualifying rounds centuries
Total: 1

 100  Barry Pinches

References

2019
2019 in snooker
2019 in Gibraltarian sport
March 2019 sports events in Europe